The New Yankee Workshop is an American half-hour woodworking television series produced by WGBH Boston, which aired on PBS. Created in 1989 by Russell Morash, the program was hosted by Norm Abram, a regular fixture on Morash's television series This Old House.

Overview
The New Yankee Workshop featured the construction of woodworking projects, including workshop accessories, architectural details and furniture projects ranging from simple pieces to complex, high-quality reproductions of antique classic furniture. In the course of 21 seasons, approximately 235 projects were produced. In addition to furniture and cabinets, the show also focused on outdoor projects such as the building of a gazebo, shed, greenhouse, sailing boat, flag pole, mail box, cupola, and fences. He also goes to different places that are related to woodworking.

Theme song
The New Yankee Workshop theme song consists of a fast-paced guitar tune with a harmonica sound.

Set design
The shop where the show was produced is owned by Morash and is located on his property even though the viewer was given the impression that it was in Abram's backyard.

The famous sliding barn door faces west. Along the west wall is the "back bench" and drill press. Along the south wall is the miter bench and storage unit, radial arm saw, and (not seen in episodes) a computer, a TV, and a small office area. The east wall of the shop has a staircase leading to a loft area, jig storage, horizontal edge sander, and dust collector. The north wall houses sheet goods, router table, bar clamps, Timesaver wide belt sander, planer, jointer, band saw, and various mobile tools. The center area of the shop consists of the table saw and associated outfeed tables as well as a large assembly table. In the northeast section of the building is a separate finishing room.

Cancelation
On October 16, 2009, WGBH Boston announced that no further episodes of New Yankee Workshop would be produced. In remarking on the end of the show, Abram stated, "We've had a great run, built challenging projects, met wonderful woodworkers and received loyal support from millions of viewers." Abram later claimed that the entire duration of the show was fully funded through underwriting and could have kept going, but he decided he had accomplished everything he wanted to do and wanted to spend more time with his family.

Until September 5, 2022, episodes of The New Yankee Workshop were available to stream on NewYankee.com and through the This Old House Insider subscription service. Project plan PDFs were also available with the Insider subscription. It was announced that the license agreement between Morash Assoc., Inc. WGBH Educational Foundation, Linnor, Inc. and This Old House Ventures, LLC (parent company Roku, Inc.) had expired and episodes would no longer be available through This Old House.

On January 13, 2023, the New Yankee Workshop YouTube channel posted a video of Russell Morash announcing the availability of episodes on YouTube. After giving a tour of the New Yankee Workshop Morash ended the video by stating, "We are thrilled to know that YouTube is now showing The New Yankee episodes to a whole new generation of people who may have somehow missed out the first time it was around, and now they're available anytime you tune to YouTube and want to watch a feast of woodworking. It's all there and it's all for you to enjoy and I certainly hope you do."

Award nominations
 Daytime Emmy Award for Outstanding Service Show, Russell Morash (1997, 1998, 2000)
 Daytime Emmy Award for Single Camera Editing, Gary Stephenson (1999)

Episodes

Over the course of its 21 seasons, at least 235 projects were built on New Yankee Workshop.

Season 1 (1989)
The closing credits for the first eight seasons of The New Yankee Workshop consisted of an exterior shot of the workshop with a sign in it, as we see Norm Abram closing the workshop door, and gets ready to go home and have dinner with his family.
On early episodes of this season, with the workshop door already opened, a dog is seen running away while Norm puts his tools away. For the rest of the entire season, after Norm puts his tools away, he moves the table, and the corner cupboard out of the way, and closes the workshop door.

Season 2 (1990)

Season 3 (1991)

Season 4 (1992)

Season 5 (1993)

Season 6 (1994)
 This was the last season to use the News Plantin credits font, which had been used since Season 1.

Season 7 (1995)
Starting with this season, the end credits are shown in a Copperplate font.

Season 8 (1996)
 Beginning this season, Norm Abram is credited as master carpenter in the closing credits.

Season 9 (1997)
Starting with this season, The New Yankee Workshop introduced a new closing sequence. It shows an exterior shot of the workshop. Then, Abram opens the workshop door, and walks out to get some fresh air. Then, Abram walks back in the shop. It was also used for reruns of older episodes on HGTV.

Season 10 (1998)

Season 10 introduced a new episode numbering system. Previous seasons had been numbered in three digit format using the season number (1-9) as the first digit, and the episode number making up the last two digits. So, for example, the third episode of the 4th season would be episode number 403. Starting with this season, episode numbers consisted of four digits with the first two digits representing the last two digits of the  year in which the season first aired and the last two digits representing the episode number within that season. So, the fourth episode of the 10th season, having first aired in 1998, would be episode number 9804.

Season 11 (1999)

Season 12 (2000)

Season 13 (2001)

Season 14 (2002)

Season 15 (2003)

Season 16 (2004)

Season 17 (2005)

Season 18 (2006)

Season 19 (2007)

Season 20 (2008)

Season 20 varied slightly in format from previous seasons in that the first nine episodes were devoted to a single, larger project. This project involved a kitchen remodeling and focused on cabinet construction. The kitchen being remodeled belongs to Morash. Season 20 also represented the last season in which original projects were constructed for the show.

Season 21 (2009)

Season 21 stood out from other seasons in that it had approximately twice the number of episodes of any previous season. The season also varied from previous seasons in that no new projects were built. Instead each episode rebroadcast a project built in a previous season. All of the rebroadcast episodes were from either the ninth or tenth season. Each "new" episode consisted of the original episode prefaced by a newly recorded introduction by Abram.

References

External links
 The New Yankee Workshop Official Web site which includes a shop tour, a program guide and other features including a Webcam
 
 A Norm Abram Fan Site features documentation of tools used in the series and a comprehensive program guide
 TV.com Information about the show; includes Original Air Date and project dimensions.

PBS original programming
1990s American television series
1989 American television series debuts
2009 American television series endings
Television shows set in Massachusetts
Television series by WGBH
Woodworking mass media
Arts and crafts television series
Reuse
American television spin-offs
This Old House